Pocono Mountains Municipal Airport  is a public airport two miles northwest of Mount Pocono, in  Coolbaugh Township, Monroe County, Pennsylvania. It is owned by the Pocono Mountains Municipal Airport Authority. The National Plan of Integrated Airport Systems for 2011–2015 categorized it as a general aviation facility.

Facilities
The airport covers 275 acres (111 ha) at an elevation of 1,915 feet (584 m). It has two asphalt runways: 5/23 is 4,000 by 100 feet (1,219 x 30 m) and 13/31 is 5,001 by 75 feet (1,524 x 23 m).

In the year ending August 31, 2011 the airport had 19,850 aircraft operations, average 54 per day: 98.5% general aviation and 1.5% military. 19 aircraft were then based at the airport: 79% single-engine, 10.5% multi-engine, and 10.5% helicopter.

References

External links 

 
 Pocono Mountains Municipal Airport at Pennsylvania DOT Bureau of Aviation
 Aerial image as of April 1999 from USGS The National Map
 

Airports in Pennsylvania
Transportation buildings and structures in Monroe County, Pennsylvania